Meadow Creek is a  long 3rd order tributary to the Rocky River in Chatham County, North Carolina.

Course
Meadow Creek rises about 1.5 miles southeast of Siler City, North Carolina in Chatham County and then flows southeast to join the Rocky River about 3.5 miles southwest of Siler City.

Watershed
Meadow Creek drains  of area, receives about 47.8 in/year of precipitation, has a wetness index of 423.48 and is about 54% forested.

References

Rivers of North Carolina
Rivers of Chatham County, North Carolina